is a fighting video game trilogy that were released for the Neo Geo platform in the early 1990s. It was the second fighting game franchise created by SNK, following the Fatal Fury series and is set in the same fictional universe as a prequel to the Fatal Fury series.

Gameplay
The Art of Fighting series follows the conventions of the time in the sense that the player faces a variety of opponents in best two-out-of-three matches. Each of the game's characters have a unique fighting style and set of special techniques. The player has two basic attacks—punch and kick—as well as a utility button that switches between punches, kicks, and throws. A fourth button is used for taunting. Art of Fighting'''s contribution to the genre was the inclusion of a "spirit gauge" underneath the character's life bar. When characters perform special techniques, their spirit gauge is depleted and their special attacks become weaker. Players can also drain their opponent's spirit gauge by taunting them.

The Art of Fighting series was also the first fighting series to allow players to perform a "super attack". In the original Art of Fighting, the player's character can learn a super attack (dubbed the super death blow) by completing one of the game's bonus rounds (this technique is available by default in the 3rd game). All three games also feature "Desperation Attacks" that can only be performed when the player's health is low and the life bar is flashing.

The series also introduced graphical scaling into the fighting game genre: as the characters move towards each other, the camera zooms in to maximize the level of detail. Character sprites in Art of Fighting change as the fight progresses to become more bruised and cut as damage is taken.

Plot
The games follow the struggles of the students of the Kyokugen Karate Dojo, Ryo Sakazaki and Robert Garcia, in 1978. Ryo is the son of the Kyokugen Karate discipline's creator, Takuma Sakazaki, and Robert is the wayward son of a billionaire family from Italy. The initial two games are set in South Town, a common location in SNK games that is also the setting for the Fatal Fury series, while the third appears to take place in a fictitious area of Mexico.

The plot of Art of Fighting alludes to Fatal Fury. Art of Fighting 2, for instance, documents the beginning of "The King of Fighters" tournaments and the rise of Geese Howard, a character in Fatal Fury, from corrupt police commissioner to crime lord of Southtown. Takuma is said to be a contemporary of Jeff Bogard, adoptive father of Fatal Fury's main heroes, Terry and Andy Bogard; Jeff Bogard's murder at the hands of Geese Howard triggers the events of the Fatal Fury series.

Series' continuity
The Art of Fighting series originally served as a prequel to the Fatal Fury series, taking place during the late 1970s and early 1980s. This is reflected by the characters' official birthdates in the series and given ages in each game. This is made even more obvious with the appearance of a young Geese Howard in Art of Fighting 2, and most of all, Ryo's best student who debuted as one of the playable fighters in Garou: Mark of the Wolves, Khushnood Butt. The Hyper Neo-Geo 64 game Buriki One and the PlayStation port of Fatal Fury: Wild Ambition features an older modern-day Ryo adopting his father's former identity of Mr. Karate. While The King of Fighters series features characters from the Art of Fighting series and alludes to events occurring in the games, it follows a completely different continuity from that of the actual Art of Fighting and Fatal Fury games. This was done so that the Art of Fighting characters could fight alongside the Fatal Fury cast and other characters without aging them, but also continue to maintain the existing stories from the other games.

Games
Art of Fighting (1992)

Taking place in 1978, Ryo Sakazaki and Robert Garcia set out to find Ryo's sister, Yuri, who has been kidnapped by Mr. Big. Mr. Big has taken the girl to entice Takuma Sakazaki, Ryo's father and originator of the fictional form of karate known as Kyokugen Karate ("Extreme style"), and because Ryo refused to work for Big. After they defeat Mr. Big, Ryo and Robert face the enigmatic Mr. Karate. Art of Fightings story ends with a cliff-hanger; Yuri is about to disclose the true identity of Mr. Karate as their father Takuma.

Ryo and Robert are the only playable heroes in the single player story mode, although eight of the game's ten fighters are playable by default in the two player versus mode. Mr. Big and Mr. Karate can be played in the Neo Geo MVS (arcade) version by reaching their respective stages in the game then having a second player join in, and in the Neo Geo AES (console) version through the use of cheat codes.Art of Fightings events are referenced often in the wider SNK universe; The King of Fighters '97, for instance, parodies the events of the game in its ending.

In the United States, the RePlay arcade charts listed Art of Fighting as the top-grossing software conversion kit in December 1992.Art of Fighting was re-released for Nintendo Switch on 21 September 2017.

A Sharp X68000 version of Art of Fighting was in development by Magical Company but it went unreleased for unknown reasons.

Bonus Stages
Every time the player defeats two opponents while playing story mode, there are three bonus stages players can choose from:

Bottle Cut
The objective is to cut off the tops of five bottles on a table. The player must carefully time and press the A button when a special bar fills to full for maximum power. Cutting all the bottles at once completes the stage, rewarding the player by increasing their spirit gauge for the rest of the game.

Ice Pillar Smash
Within a time limit, the player has to build up enough power to break five blocks of ice. Pressing the A button repeatedly will fill a gauge on the screen. If successful, the player will be rewarded with an increased life bar for the rest of the game.

Initiate Super Death Blow
The player must execute a super move, the Haoh Shoko Ken (misspelled as "Haow-Ken" in the game), a specific number of times to learn and use in the game against the other characters. The number of times needed to perform the move in the given time limit is dependent on the game's difficulty level. This is also the only bonus game that if it's successfully completed, it cannot be chosen again. While this move must be learned by completing the bonus game in story mode, it is available by default in two player mode.

Amusements Arcade UK: Butlin's Minehead listButlins (1994–2001) (Neo Geo MVS: Neo-Fruito-MVS – 5 Slot: Art of Fighting (1992), Samurai Shodown (1993), Mutation Nation (1992), League Bowling (1990) and Super Sidekicks (1992))

Art of Fighting 2 (1994)Art of Fighting 2 was released in 1994. The second installment in the Art of Fighting series added the "rage gauge"; similar to the "spirit system" of its predecessor, it limited the use and effectiveness of special attacks.

The game's story is set a year after the original in 1979. Geese Howard, a rising star in South Town's criminal underworld, summons all 12 fighters both veterans and newcomers to the city for a martial arts tournament, "The King of Fighters". Geese was the final boss and series original antagonist of SNK's other related fighting game franchise Fatal Fury, whose story took place two years after the events of Art of Fighting 2 where the late Jeff Bogard had been murdered by the hands of his former Hakkyokuseiken sparring partner Geese, which sparks the revenge of Jeff's adoptive sons Terry Bogard and Andy Bogard to fight in Geese's next King of Fighters tournament which takes place a decade later in 1991. The events of all three Art of Fighting sagas is canonically a prequel trilogy to the Fatal Fury series.Art of Fighting 2 was the only time Yuri Sakazaki was a playable character in the series. It also marked the only time that she donned her trademark outfit, which was made famous in The King of Fighters series. This game also marks the debut of Takuma Sakazaki without his Mr. Karate persona, as well as Eiji Kisaragi, who both appear in the King of Fighters series. Ryuhaku Todo, the first character the player fights in the original Art of Fighting, is the only character not present in the sequel. All of the playable characters are selectable from the beginning in both single player and two player mode. The final boss by default is Mr. Big, though it is possible to fight Geese Howard as a secret boss if the player meets specific requirements in single player mode; Geese is not a playable character, however, with the exception of the VS mode in the SNES version.

Bonus stages
This time the bonus stages are reworked: to increase the rage gauge, the player's character has to chop down a tree with one punch, to increase the maximum health meter, the player's character must defeat a number of punks under a certain time limit, and the Initiate Super Death Blow stage has now been adapted for each character's super special move.Art of Fighting 2 was re-released for the Wii's Virtual Console in North America on 28 July 2008 and Nintendo Switch's ACA Neo Geo worldwide on 11 January 2018.

Reception
The game was praised by both GamePro and Electronic Gaming Monthly for having far better graphics, sound, character selection and gameplay technique than the original Art of Fighting, though three of EGMs four reviewers complained that in single player mode the opponent AI is "incredibly cheap". GamePro gave it ratings (out of 5) of 5 for graphics, 5 for sound, 4.5 for controls, and 4.5 for fun factor. Electronic Gaming Monthlys four reviewers gave it ratings (out of 10) of 8, 8, 6, and 8. Computer and Video Games gave it a 95% score, calling it "easily the best beat-'em up to appear in recent years", comparing it favorably with recent Street Fighter II incarnations but criticizing its high £150-175 cost.

Art of Fighting 3: The Path of the Warrior (1996)Art of Fighting 3: The Path of the Warrior (ART OF FIGHTING: Ryūko no Ken Gaiden, in Japanese: ART OF FIGHTING 龍虎の拳 外伝) was the first game in the series (and the first SNK fighting game) to use motion capture for its animation, often being noted as some of the best sprite-work SNK has produced. It features a new cast of characters with the exception of Ryo and Robert. Yuri Sakazaki is seen in the game, but only as a side character in Ryo and Robert's story mode.

The story switched focus from the Sakazaki family to Robert Garcia. Robert disappears to search for an old childhood friend, Freia Lawrence, and he tracks her to Glass Hill, Mexico. Freia is wanted by the game's main antagonist, Wyler, to complete a powerful elixir that was created by his and Freia's fathers. The drug affects users in a similar manner as the potion in The Strange Case of Dr Jekyll and Mr Hyde.

One of the game's characters, Kasumi Todoh, became a part of The King of Fighters cast. This game is the only one in the series to have a CD Drama Arranged Soundtrack.Art of Fighting 3: The Path of the Warrior was re-released for the Wii's Virtual Console in North America on 21 March 2013 and Nintendo Switch's ACA Neo Geo worldwide on 2 November 2017.

Reception
The four reviewers of Electronic Gaming Monthly gave the Neo Geo AES version a 5 out of 10. They lambasted the game for its poor balance, with their biggest complaint being the new Ultra-Cool Attacks, since they are easy to execute, cannot be blocked, and deal a massive amount of damage. They further criticized that the game lacks originality and innovation, failing to distinguish itself from the deluge of 2D fighting games coming out at the time. A reviewer for Next Generation saw no problem with the game's balance but concurred that it is "too similar to every other 2D fighting game on the market". He gave the Neo Geo AES version three out of five stars. According to Famitsu, the Neo Geo CD version sold over 20,877 copies in its first week on the market.

Ports and compilations
All three games were released for the Neo Geo MVS arcade system, Neo Geo AES home console, and Neo Geo CD, with the first one also being included on SNK Arcade Classics Vol. 1:
 Art of Fighting for the PC Engine CD (requires the Arcade Card, Japan only), SNES, and Sega Genesis/Mega Drive
 Ryuuko no Ken 2 (Art of Fighting 2) for the Super Famicom (Japan only)
  for the PlayStation 2 includes: Art of Fighting, Art of Fighting 2, and Art of Fighting 3: The Path of the Warrior Art of Fighting, Art of Fighting 2, and Art of Fighting 3: The Path of the Warrior for the Wii Virtual Console

The SNES version of Art of Fighting features an extended ending which ties into Art of Fighting 2, rather than ending the game on a cliffhanger like the Neo Geo, PC Engine CD, and Mega Drive/Genesis versions. Additionally, the English localization of the port was censored. Many of the locations had their names changed (Mac's Bar was changed to Mac's Cafe), the No Smoking sign in Todo's stage was removed, and the player can only partially expose King's bra when she is defeated with a special or super move. The vehicle driving scenes were also omitted.

The Neo Geo version of Art of Fighting was released for the Wii Virtual Console in October 2007 and Art of Fighting 2 was released in July 2008.

The PlayStation 2 version of Art of Fighting stays true to the original Neo Geo version, but the vocals in the opening title have been stripped, as have Ryo's and Yuri's vocals during the ending.

The Mega Drive/Genesis version lacks the zooming effect. Certain gameplay elements have been changed as well; the Ryuuko Ranbu is blockable, Jack's drop kick special move only goes two-thirds the length of the screen, and Lee's claw spin attacks have invincibility during the starting pose, among various other changes.

Appearances outside the series
Some of the Art of Fighting cast have continued appearing in other SNK fighting games (particularly in The King of Fighters series, which the titular tournaments, as it mentioned above, canonically and chronologically beginning during the events of Art of Fighting 2) since the last game in the Art of Fighting series was released. In the same way that Geese Howard appears as a secret boss in Art of Fighting 2, Ryo Sakazaki appears as a secret boss in Fatal Fury Special and Fatal Fury: Wild Ambition. Unlike the battle against Geese in Art of Fighting 2, the battles against Ryo in both games are depicted as a "dream matches" and do not occur in the series' storyline.

As a result of these crossover appearances between the two franchises, SNK produced The King of Fighters series, pitting characters from both series against each other. As mentioned in the continuity section above, the series eschews the continuity of the Art of Fighting and Fatal Fury games for the purpose of having the Art of Fighting cast fight against everyone else without aging them. Ryo, Robert, and Yuri have appeared in nearly every installment along with King, Takuma, and Kasumi, who are constant characters as well. Eiji and Mr. Big also made appearances as playable characters in the series.

Characters from the series have also appeared in the SNK vs. Capcom series and in NeoGeo Battle Coliseum. Capcom's Capcom vs. SNK: Millennium Fight 2000 features Ryo, Yuri, and King while Capcom vs. SNK 2 adds Ryuhaku Todoh to the lineup. SNK vs. Capcom: SVC Chaos features Ryo, Kasumi, and Takuma under his Mr. Karate guise. NeoGeo Battle Coliseum features Lee Pai Long, Mr. Big and an aged Robert Garcia along with the older Ryo Sakazaki from Buriki One. In KOF: Maximum Impact 2, Ryuhaku Todoh drives the truck in one of the extra games.

The Street Fighter Alpha character Dan Hibiki is a parody of Ryo Sakazaki and Robert Garcia.

In Super Smash Bros. Ultimate, some elements from the Art of Fighting series appear as downloadable content; specifically, two music tracks from the series appear (and can be played on the King of Fighters Stadium stage), Ryo Sakazaki makes three cameos in the game (as a background character in King of Fighters Stadium, as a spirit, and as the basis for a Mii costume), and Yuri Sakazaki and King both have background cameos in King of Fighters Stadium.

CharactersArt of Fighting was the first fighting game by SNK to feature the character designs of former illustrator Shinkiro, who would go on to do the character designs for the later Fatal Fury and The King of Fighters games.

Introduced in Art of Fighting
Ryo Sakazaki

Robert Garcia

Ryuhaku Todoh

 is the first opponent in the arcade mode of Art of Fighting. He is the creator and main teacher of the Todoh fighting style, which derives from Jujutsu, Kendo and Kobujutsu. Todoh has a long-standing rivalry with disciples of the Kyokugenryu school of karate and considers them a threat to his dojo in terms of profits; and also there is a long-standing personal animosity dating back to a rivalry with the Kyokugenryu karate master Takuma Sakazaki which began when both men were very young.

It was confirmed by his daughter Kasumi that it was Ryo who defeated Todoh, as Ryo wanted to interrogate him to know about who kidnapped Yuri, Todoh went into hiding and according to his wife Mizuho, he's been training for a rematch against Ryo. Because of his disappearance, Kasumi goes on a personal quest to look for her father and gain revenge on Ryo and all Kyokugenryu karate disciples to try to reclaim her family's honor. However, in SNK vs. Capcom: SVC Chaos he makes a short appearance after seeing Kasumi's development. He also appears in The King of Fighters 2000 as a striker from Kasumi named . He has also been a playable character in Capcom vs. SNK 2. He also appears in the game Samurai Shodown II during Gen-an's ending.

 Jack Turner 

 is a member of Mr. Big's syndicate, and a developer of his own fighting style. One of Mr. Big's highest-ranking subordinates, he devastates anyone who crosses his path. Jack is also the leader of the Southtown gang known as the Neo Black Cats. Humorously, in Jack's ending in AOF2, it was revealed that he wanted to make the gang into a dance group.

 Lee Pai Long 

Lee Pai Long (Chinese: 李白龍) is a master of Chinese martial arts from Taiwan and an expert of his country's medicine. His adoptive father and mentor, Lee Gakusuo, passed on his pharmaceutic knowledge and martial arts to him before instructing Lee to finish his studies in South Town. Once he arrived there, Lee became fascinated with the local style of Kenpo and neglected his roots to be a street fighter. He works as the director of the Southtown prison, but also has a small herbal shop which he runs part-time. A former adversary and long-time friend of Ryo Sakazaki's father Takuma, he enters the tournament to test Ryo's skills. And like his friend, he dons a mask; in this case, a Monkey Mask. Humorously, in his ending to AOF2, it was discovered that Lee would become famous for finding the cure to haemorrhoids. He has also been featured in NeoGeo Battle Coliseum as a playable character.

King

 is a female Muay Thai fighter from France who dresses as a man in order to present herself as a reliable fighter, hide her true identity, and for various other reasons such as the fact that she has been at war with her own sex for years. Originally, her true gender was meant to be a surprise for the player, revealed only if she was defeated with a special move; as time went by, however, her design became more feminine, albeit without straying too far from the original concept. In the first Art of Fighting, King appears as a CPU-controlled character. She is hired by the criminal Mr. Big to work as a bouncer in his tournament. After King is defeated by Ryo Sakazaki and Robert Garcia who were searching for Ryo's kidnapped sister, Yuri, King agrees to help them to find Mr. Big. In Art of Fighting 2, King enters into the King of Fighters tournament in order to win the prize money to pay for an operation for her younger brother, Jan, to regain the use of his legs. As such, Ryo and Robert decide to use the prize money to pay for the operation in gratitude for helping them to find Yuri.

King is also a recurring character from The King of Fighters series as part of the Women Fighters Team participating in various tournaments, usually acting as the de facto leader and peacekeeper. The team is initially composed of King, Mai Shiranui and Yuri, but Yuri is replaced in '96 by Kasumi Todoh and in '97 and '98 by Chizuru Kagura. In The King of Fighters '99, the tournament now requires four members per team, and while Mai joins to the Fatal Fury Team, Chizuru left competition. However, Kasumi, Li Xiangfei and Blue Mary join King to complete the team. In The King of Fighters 2000, King is requested by Yuri to replace her in the Art of Fighting Team, in which she bonds with Ryo, Robert and Ryo's father, Takuma. She returns to the Women Fighters Team in The King of Fighters 2001 with Mai, Hinako Shijou and Li Xiangfei. In The King of Fighters 2003, King joins Mary and Mai once again in the Women Fighters Team as the tournament returns to the use of three fighters per team. In The King of Fighters XI, the Women Fighters Team is disbanded since Mai went into searching for her boyfriend Andy Bogard and Mary joins the Agents Team. King is once again requested to enter into the tournament with the Art of Fighting Team with Ryo and Yuri as Robert has problems with his organization and Takuma is in a weak state.

King has also appeared in The King of Fighters Neowave with her original team and in The King of Fighters: Kyo aiding Kyo Kusanagi and Blue Mary into investigating Geese Howard. She was removed from The King of Fighters 2002, but was added as a playable character in the home version from the game as well as in the remake, The King of Fighters 2002: Unlimited Match, teaming up with Kasumi and Mai. Additionally, she has appeared in Capcom vs SNK and Capcom vs SNK 2.

 Mickey Rogers 

 is a former professional boxer who was expelled from the ranks after he accidentally killed a man in the ring. He currently stalks Southtown seeking opponents to vent his anger and frustration on, and enters the tournament for the same reason. Like Crawley, Mickey gets a haircut between his two appearances. In the first AOF, Mickey has long hair, worn in dreadlocks. In AOF2, he has short hair. In Art of Fighting, Mickey becomes a small-time hood who works for Mr. Big so that he can get money as a street hustler. In Art of Fighting 2, Mickey has since reformed, wanting to get back into the professional boxing circuit. In Mickey's AOF2 ending, his trainer Pops (who is visible in Mickey's stage as well) informs him that his time has come, and he has a title bout. He is voiced by Kay Inage, who also voices Robert.

 John Crawley 

 is a martial arts instructor, and with his brutal and aggressive fighting style was known to his friends as "The Madman" and "The Killing Machine". He enters the tournament to win the prize money and test his skills. In the first AOF, Crawley has longer hair. By the time AOF2 occurs, his hair is cut shorter. In John's AOF2 ending, the US Military attempts to recruit him to rescue the President's canary, but John refuses. Although it is not mentioned in the game, John seems to be assigned to the aircraft carrier , since a large "62" is visible on the ship's island.

Mr. Big

 is the sub-boss character from the first two Art of Fighting games. Mr. Big was formerly in the Army's Special Forces, and fights skillfully with a pair of eskrima rattan sticks. He has been involved with the mob for as long as he can remember. He made it big in Southtown, a city as seedy and corrupt as he is. He joins Geese Howard's criminal organization, soon becoming his right-hand man. Big secretly feared Takuma Sakazaki, the master of Kyokugenryu Karate, so he ordered the kidnapping of Takuma's daughter, Yuri, and threatened Takuma into working for him. The plan backfired when Ryo Sakazaki and Robert Garcia fought their way through Southtown's crime to find both of them, beating Big senseless to rescue Yuri and Takuma. King worked as a bouncer at one of Mr. Big's establishments.

In 1996, Geese brought Mr. Big and Wolfgang Krauser to The King of Fighters, and revealed that he was after the Orochi power following the tournament's dramatic conclusion. Enraged, Mr. Big had a sniper take a shot at Geese, but the plan failed, and Mr. Big bailed out. The team also appears in The King of Fighters '98: Ultimate Match. Mr. Big has also been featured in The King of Fighters: Kyo, NeoGeo Battle Coliseum and the PlayStation 2 version from The King of Fighters XI. He also appears in the PS2 port from The King of Fighters 2000 as an assistant version of Takuma.

Mr. Big is played by Sam Hargrave in the 2010 live-action film adaptation of The King of Fighters, being the only character from the Art of Fighting series in the film.

Takuma Sakazaki

 is Ryo and Yuri's father who left them prior to the first Art of Fighting, though as the master and creator of Kyokugenryu Karate, he has taught both Ryo and Robert at a young age, with Yuri becoming his student later on after the first game. Takuma appears as the final boss of the game as a masked warrior named , having taken Yuri as a hostage. Before being defeated by Ryo and Robert, Yuri stops them, revealing his identity. It is later revealed that Takuma was forced to work for Geese Howard and that his right-hand man, Mr. Big, kidnapped Yuri to put him under control. In the SNES port, Takuma Sakazaki reveals himself as the unwilling killer of Jeff Bogard, stating he wouldn't have eliminated him but Geese had already taken Yuri hostage. In Art of Fighting 2, Takuma rebels against Geese and Mr. Big by fighting in their King of Fighters tournament, but retreats due to the several injuries he has.

Takuma also appears in The King of Fighters series as part of the Art of Fighting Team along with Robert and Ryo, but he lets Yuri take his place in The King of Fighters '96 as he decides to retire, only to return in The King of Fighters '99 to the team as the tournament now requires four fighters per team. He once again retires in The King of Fighters 2003 with the tournament returning to use 3 members per team. He becomes very weak in this game, but uses this state to make King enter the Art of Fighting Team to intensify her relationship with Ryo. In The King of Fighters 2002 and The King of Fighters Neowave he appears with the original Art of Fighting Team, whereas in The King of Fighters '98 and The King of Fighters 2002: Unlimited Match he is part of the Oyaji Team, composed of elder characters from the series. In SNK vs. Capcom: SVC Chaos there is a boss character named , which is an enhanced version of the normal Mr. Karate (also playable in the game). Following an absence from the series since the 2002 installment, Takuma makes his return debut to the series in The King of Fighters XIII, rejoining Robert and Ryo from the 1994 team, with his Honki ni Natta form from SVC Chaos as his downloadable EX form. As of The King of Fighters XIV, Takuma's job at both the Kyokugenryu dojo and barbecue restaurant puts a huge strain on his body, preventing him from competing in the tournament as Ryo and Robert join Yuri to reunite the 1996 team.

Introduced in Art of Fighting 2
Yuri Sakazaki

 Eiji Kisaragi 

 is a Japanese ninja from the feared and respected Kisaragi clan, whose techniques dates back from ancient history, through his ancestor Zantetsu, from The Last Blade series. His school is the sworn enemy of both the Sakazaki clan and Kyokugenryu Karate. Eiji is a mercenary, willing to kill for anyone so long as they pay well. In The King of Fighters '95, Eiji joins Billy Kane and Iori Yagami in the Rivals Team as in order to kill the Sakazaki Family (Ryo, Yuri and Takuma). Eiji's team failed to reach the finals of the 1995 tournament and he was unable to get a 'clear shot' at the Sakazaki family. While about to escape and go search for them on his own, Iori Yagami appeared in front of Eiji and Billy Kane and brutally beat them, nearly killing them both.

Eiji did not appear as a playable, or story, character in a King of Fighters game again until The King of Fighters XI, in which he joins Kasumi Todoh and Malin as the Anti-Kyokungenryu Team to find and defeat the Sakazakis once again, only to be badly beaten by an enraged King who was too angry at the Sakazaki's, but for different reasons. Eiji did eventually make the cut for The King of Fighters '98 Ultimate Match along with Kasumi Todoh and the '96 Boss Team. In The King of Fighters 2000, he appears as an assistant character for Lin. He also makes short cameos with Billy Kane in some of his introductions against Iori, in which he also seeks revenge for what he did to them.

Temjin

 is the only Mongolian dock worker at the Southtown port. Temjin resigned himself to a period of menial work as a manure loader. Finding the job paid 25 bucks an hour, Temjin stayed on, earning money for the small school in Mongolia where he dreams of teaching one day.

Geese Howard

Introduced in Art of Fighting 3: The Path of the Warrior
Jin Fu-Ha

 is a former disciple of Eiji Kisaragi, who near mastering end, betrayed him. He then decides to kill Eiji, to test if he is strong enough to do so, he decides to see if he can defeat Eiji's sworn enemy Ryo Sakazaki and searches for him, eventually tracking him down and confronting him in GlassHill Valley while Ryo is searching for his friend Robert Garcia there. Unlike most of the characters, Jin's final battle is not with Wyler, but Ryo Sakazaki. Unique to Jin Fu-Ha's ending is a page of text that tells the player Jin will one day fight Eiji but until then will wander the globe alone in the shadows.

Karman Cole

 is a long-time employee of Robert Garcia's parents in a personal assistant-like role who has known Robert since he was a child. The Garcias send Karman to find their son after he disappeared to look for his old childhood friend Freia Lawrence which has led him to GlassHill Valley. Karman is a loyal employee who seems very fond of Robert Garcia and lets him get away with much more than he should. Karman's final fight in Art of Fighting 3 is not Wyler like most of the characters but Robert. Despite this, Karman allows him to finish his search for Freia.

Kasumi Todoh

 is the daughter of the martial arts master Ryuhaku Todoh, the first enemy in the original Art of Fighting. Kasumi grew up learning the Todoh school of Jujutsu and Kendo taught to her by her father. As her family's sole heir, she does all she can to stand up for the Todoh way. When Ryuhaku stayed at Southtown to settle an old score with the famous Kyokugen karate master named Takuma Sakazaki, Kasumi remained obediently in her house, waiting for her father's return. A couple of months later, she learns that Ryuhaku has been defeated by Ryo Sakazaki, Takuma's son and has not been seen since. She decides to fight Ryo and anybody else in order to avenge her father's defeat, but her mother and Ryuhaku's wife, Mizuho does not like that idea. Ryo replaces Wyler as Kasumi's final boss, making Wyler a sub-boss that she must defeat before she can fight against Ryo in her own storyline. After she defeats Ryo from within her ending, Mizuho, who was apparently chasing Kasumi, catches up with her and convinces her to make peace with Ryo to the point of slapping her in the face, confirming that her father has been training for a rematch against Ryo in the near future (thus explaining his disappearance and hiding).

Kasumi goes on to participate in the 1996 King of Fighters tournament with King and Mai Shiranui, replacing Yuri Sakazaki who left for Ryo's team in place of Yuri's father Takuma (Takuma threatened to seize Yuri's assets in order to motivate Yuri to join Ryo's team). After Goenitz (highest priest of the Orochi Power) was defeated (not to mention taking his own life), King took Mai and Kasumi to her bar in order to celebrate their participation in the tournament.

In 1999, she teams up with King, Blue Mary and Li Xiangfei. Later in 2000, Kasumi rejoins Mai, and the two team up with Yuri and Hinako Shijou. While Kasumi had some reservations about teaming up with Yuri (mainly because Yuri is a Kyokugen Karate practitioner), Kasumi knows that she has to live under a family code of ethics and accepts Yuri as her teammate. In The King of Fighters XI, she teams up with Malin and the bitter rival of the Sakazaki family, Eiji Kisaragi to form the Anti-Kyokugen Team. She has also been featured in The King of Fighters '98: Ultimate Match as an edit character, in The King of Fighters 2002: Unlimited Match in the Women Fighters Team with Mai and King, and SNK vs. Capcom: SVC Chaos.

Lenny Creston

 is a private investigator who works with Rody Birts. Though there seems to be some romantic tension between them, the two are partners in a business sense only. They have been hired by Wyler to find Freia (also a schoolfriend of Robert Garcia) and deliver her to him. The two appear to have a bad reputation within their profession and Lenny sees their new assignment as their 'big chance'. Lenny is a tough, straight-talking woman but with a caring nature underneath. She fights using a whip, though she appears to be fond of using it for different things (such as dragging Rody around).

Rody Birts

 is a private investigator who works with Lenny Creston. Though she dominates him, their relationship is good-natured and there is even a hint of romantic tension. The two appear to have a bad reputation as private eyes. He has come to GlassHill Valley, Mexico because he has been hired by Wyler to find an old childhood friend Freia for him.

Wang Koh-San

Wang Koh-San is an artist entering a competition, and is also a friend of Lee Pai Long. He comes to GlassHill Valley for inspiration for the competition, but once there he learns of Wyler's Elixir and thinks that it will interest Lee. Wang travels with his pet Pelican Hoeh-Hoeh. In his ending, he returns home and lets Hoeh-Hoeh choose the painting for competition. Then humorous 'drawings' of Hoeh-Hoeh interacting with all of the characters from the game are displayed.

Sinclair

 is a mini-boss of sorts. She has a flashy sword fighting style reminiscent of Indian swordsmanship combined with black magic. She apparently works for Wyler, but acts like is setting a trap for him to stop his plans. Like Wyler, Sinclair does not have an ending sequence: completing the game only yields the staff roll. Unlike Wyler, she can be thrown, but cannot use throw moves herself. She has only appeared in Art of Fighting 3 thus far.

Wyler

 is the final boss in Art of Fighting 3. He works on perfecting a powerful elixir that was originally developed by his father and Freia Lawrence's father. However, the essential data needed for completing it was taken by Freia's father when the partnership broke up. Wyler believes this action is the cause of his father becoming destitute and even the cause of his death. Wyler hires the private investigator partners Rody Birts and Lenny Creston to find her. Wyler finds Freia, though seemingly without the help of the private eyes he hired. He completes the elixir and takes it himself, turning into a large Hulk-like man, but has an unforeseen after-effect and reverts his mind to a childlike state. Freia choose to stay and tend to him. Wyler is a playable character, though he does not have an ending sequence of his own.

Anime
A Japanese animated television movie, was created and directed by Hiroshi Fukutomi, animated by Studio Comet and produced by NAS. It was the third animated co-production between SNK and NAS, following Fatal Fury: Legend of the Hungry Wolf and Fatal Fury 2: The New Battle. The designs of some characters were based on their appearances in the Japanese commercials for Art of Fighting 2. Although most of the cast from the original game is featured, Lee Pai Long, Micky Rogers and Takuma Sakazaki do not appear. Yuri Sakazaki is voiced by Ayumi Hamasaki, before she established herself as a successful J-Pop singer. In the English distribution, she was voiced by Veronica Taylor, who was also known for voicing Ash in the first 8 seasons of the Pokémon anime, as well as the first 8 Pokémon films and the hour long special Pokémon: Mewtwo Returns.Art of Fighting was produced by Kenji Shimizu and Yoshiro Kataoka for Fuji TV on 23 December 1993. It features a script by Nobuaki Kishima, character design by Kazunori Iwakura, and was distributed in the English language by US Manga Corps in 1997.Art of Fighting'' has received negative reception by most American websites. It was billed as stupid, idiotic and plodding, and compared to a Saturday morning cartoon. It was said it had "choppy animation, illogical perspectives, uninspired art, badly choreographed fight scenes, and most of all horrible voice acting", and none of the interest of the video game or its sequels translate into the anime. The film gathered a 14% rating at Meta Anime Rviews, placing it in the bottom 3% of the reviewed titles.

Plot
While searching for a cat, Ryo and Robert (two karate experts) witnessed a murder related to a stolen diamond. After fighting the murdering mobsters, they discovered that the top mobster, Mr. Big, had kidnapped Ryo's sister to exchange her against the diamond, which he believes to be in the possession of the protagonists. They then have to defend themselves anyway they can – mainly through kicks and punches. They both attempt to break into Big's hideout to save Yuri but their plans are foiled by the sudden arrival of the police force. Forced with no other options, they spend the night searching for the diamond. When they find it, they go to meet Big and give it to him. A big fight ensues, complete with an exploding helicopter and a bout with King and Big, but they are able to save Yuri and head back home. Todoh and the police force arrest Big and his men. They also confiscate the diamond, which is somewhere at the bottom of Big's pool.

See also
 List of The King of Fighters characters
 List of fighting games

References

External links

 Ryuko no Ken -Ten Chi Jin- at SNK Playmore
 Ryuko no Ken series at NBC Museum of SNK Playmore
 
 
 
 

1992 video games
1993 anime films
ACA Neo Geo games
Arcade video games
 
Central Park Media
D4 Enterprise games
Fighting games
2D fighting games
Fighting video games by series
Hamster Corporation games
Hudson Soft games
Muay Thai video games
Multiplayer and single-player video games
Neo Geo games
Neo Geo CD games
Nintendo Switch games
PlayStation Network games
PlayStation 4 games
Saurus games
Sega Genesis games
SNK games
SNK franchises
SNK Playmore games
Super Nintendo Entertainment System games
Takara video games
 
Trilogies
TurboGrafx-CD games
Video game franchises
Video game franchises introduced in 1992
Video game prequels
Video games set in 1978
Video games set in 1979
Virtual Console games
Windows games
Xbox One games
Video games developed in Japan